Huntington Library Quarterly is an official publication of the Huntington Library. It is a quarterly academic journal produced by the Huntington Library and published by University of Pennsylvania Press. The Huntington Library Quarterly publishes articles on the literature, history, and art of the sixteenth to eighteenth centuries in Britain and America, with special emphasis on the interactions of literature, politics, and religion; the social and political contexts of literary and art history; textual and bibliographical studies, including the history of printing and publishing; the history of science, American studies, through the early nineteenth century; and the performance history of drama and music. The journal also publishes book reviews and review articles on important work in early modern studies. Its "Intramuralia" section reports comprehensively on the Huntington's acquisitions of rare books, manuscripts, and ephemera.

External links
 
 Huntington Library official website
 Huntington Library Quarterly on the Huntington website

Art history journals
History journals
University of Pennsylvania Press academic journals
Quarterly journals
Huntington Library
English-language journals
Publications established in 1931